Aurelius Valerius Symmachus Tullianus ( 330–337) was a Roman senator and aristocrat. He was appointed consul in 330 by the emperor Constantine.

Writing between 334 and 337 (probably 337), the author Firmicus Maternus noted Tullianus for his austerity, severity, integrity, and Stoicism, though Cameron says this description represents an idealized image of a Roman senator and need not be an accurate depiction of the subject himself. Symmachus probably earned the name Tullianus, referencing Marcus Tullius Cicero, because he was famed a orator, as were several senatorial descendants of his, including Avianius Symmachus, Quintus Aurelius Symmachus (consul in 391), and Memmius Symmachus (consul 485).

Tullianus may be identical with one Phosphorius who served as proconsul of Achaia in 319. 'Phosphorius' occurs as an informal name elsewhere in his family and is otherwise rare, but confirmation of the identity is lacking. Tullianus' son was probably the senator Lucius Aurelius Avianius Symmachus.

Footnotes

References
 
 Lizzi Testa, Rita, Senatori, popolo, papi: il governo di Roma al tempo dei Valentiniani, EDIPUGLIA, 2004, p. 382, 384.
 McWilliam, Joanne, Augustine: From Rhetor to Theologian, Wilfrid Laurier University Press, 1992, p. 9.

4th-century Romans
Tullianus, Aurelius Valerius
Imperial Roman consuls
Late-Roman-era pagans
Senators of the Roman Empire
Valerii
Year of birth uncertain
Year of death unknown